The Mahabhagavata Purana, also called "Devi Purana," is an Upapurana said to be written by the sage Vyasa. It is recited between Lord Sadashiva and Sage Narada. It primarily relates stories about the supreme goddess Mahadevi and goddesses Sati, Parvati, Kali and Ganga. The Purana contains 81 chapters and includes Parvati gita and Kali Sahasranama. It also mentions scientific details about embryology and development of the fetus and describes the menstrual period and other topics of scientific interest.

Devi purana or Mahabhagavata also talks about Mahavidya, like Kali. It has some unique stories about chaya sati. It talks more about the shakta perspective of sati which makes her more bold and powerful and define as mula prakriti or real nature. It also talks a lot about tantrika worship of goddess. Devi told Shiva about her true forms and showed him her cosmic form as kali. There she tells Shiva about tantra and hold tantrika knowledge. She even refer agams and nigams as her tow hands.

Contents
The Mahabhagavata Purana describes the goddess Sati and her demise, the Mahavidyas, and details Devi worship and praises, and that Devi are the ultimate reality.

The Purana tells the story of Shakti Peeth and glorifies Kamakhya Temple at Kamrup. It describes the goddess Ganga as the partial incarnation of Sati, as she was born from Chaya Sati. It goes on to provide details about the marriage of Lord Shiva and Ganga, then details Parvati Maa and Shiva's marriage. The later chapters shares the story of the descendants of Maa Ganga to earth, heaven, and hell. It also tells the story of the birth of Kartikeya and his slaying of the demon Tarakasura. He is born from Shiva and goddess Parvati and is brought up and prepared for war by lord Bhrama, the goddess Saraswati, and the goddess Gayatri. He slays the demon and returns  to his parents. The Purana also says that Ganesha is an incarnation of lord Vishnu. Vishnu took the form of Ganesha when he wanted to impregnate Adi Shakti with a son.

Translations and Commentaries 

 Devi Mahabhagavata Purana (Sanskrit Text with English Translation) - Shanti Lal Nagar 
 A Critical Study of The Mahabhagavadpuranam - Hansa B. Bhatt

References 

Hindu texts
Puranas